Shompen Village-B is a village in the Nicobar district of the Andaman and Nicobar Islands, India. It is located in the Great Nicobar tehsil.

Demographics 

According to the 2011 census of India, Shompen Village-B has 11 households. The effective literacy rate (i.e. the literacy rate of population excluding children aged 6 and below) is 0%. Along with Shompen Village-A, the village has the highest population of Shompen people. Before the 2004 Indian Ocean earthquake and tsunami, the village was home to 106 Shompens. However, by the 2011 census, it had only 44 people.

References 

Villages in Great Nicobar tehsil